Gizella Akushika Tetteh-Agbotui is a Ghanaian architect and politician. She contested in the 2020 Ghanaian General Election and won the parliamentary seat for the Awutu Senya West Constituency.

Early life and education 
Agbotui was born on 30 November 1970 and hails from Awutu Obrachire in the Central Region of Ghana. She had her Bachelors degree in Design in Architecture in 1997. She further had her Masters degree in Business Administration in Marketing in 2007. She also had a certified PMP in Project Management in 2008. She also had her International Airport Professional in Airport Management in 2017.

Politics 
Agbotui is a member of the National Democratic Congress. In December 2020, she was elected member of Parliament for  Awutu Senya West Constituency after she competed in the 2020 Ghanaian General Election under the ticket of the National Democratic Congress and won. She pulled 32,708 votes which represents 51.58% of the total votes cast. She was elected over George Andah of the New Patriotic Party, Edith Mansah Dzonyrah of the Ghana Union Movement and Samuel Yawson of the Conventions People's Party. These obtained 29,832, 678 and 193 votes respectively out of the total valid votes cast. These were equivalent to 47.05%, 1.07% and 0.30% respectively of total valid votes cast.

Committees 
Agbotui is a member of the Works and Housing Committee and also a member of the Appointments Committee.

Career 
Mrs. Gizella Tetteh Agbotui is the CEO/ Principal Consultant of Zella Architects, an architectural firm in Ghana. She is an astute Consulting Architect with over 21 years’ experience in the Construction sector; an International Airport Professional (IAP) and a certified Project Management Professional (PMP).

Personal life 
Agbotui is the sister of Hannah Tetteh who served as member of parliament for Awutu Senya West Constituency and Minister for Foreign Affairs. She is a Christian and worships as a Methodist.

Philanthropy 
In 2021, she sponsored a 3-day program where more than 200 unlicensed drivers and motorists were trained, regularized and issued with licenses in her project dubbed GTA Licensing Project.

Honor 
In 2021, she was honored with a citation for her contribution to women empowerment in Ghana during the Under 30 Women Awards.

References 

Living people
21st-century Ghanaian women politicians
National Democratic Congress (Ghana) politicians
Ghanaian MPs 2021–2025
1970 births